Albertines may refer to:

 Albertine Wettins, a branch of the German noble House of Wettin
 Albertine Brothers, a Catholic congregation of religious brothers

See also
 Albertine (disambiguation)